KAAM, known as "K-Double-A-M", is an AM radio station broadcasting in the Dallas/Fort Worth "Metroplex" with a format of Christian Talk and Brokered programming. This station is licensed in Garland, Texas, United States, and is owned and operated by DJRD Broadcasting, LLC. KAAM is a Class B station operating on the clear-channel frequency of 770 AM.

History
The KAAM format began when the city of Dallas sold WRR, its AM station on 1310 kHz, to Bonneville Broadcasting in January 1978. In 1921, WRR (now known as KTCK) had been the first licensed radio station west of the Mississippi River, and only the second in the U.S. Because the city was going to retain the WRR call letters for its classical music FM station, Bonneville changed the 1310 call letters of the AM station to KAAM and added an FM station on 92.5 with the callsign KAFM. KAAM lasted on 1310 for many years, finally selling the station to Susquehanna Radio Corporation on February 8, 1994, which changed the call letters to KTCK (The "Ticket") and the format to all-sports.

Meanwhile, KPBC (the call letters stood for Percy B. Crawford, founder of Crawford Broadcasting) originally broadcast on 1040 kHz as a daytime-only station and changed frequencies to 770 kHz when Crawford completed the construction to create KPBC 770 in 1990 as a 24/7 station. The call letters were changed to KAAM on October 19, 1999.

In 1999, KAAM (formerly on AM 620 kHz) and its Nostalgic/Oldies format were once again revived on 770 kHz in Garland, Texas, by another owner/enthusiast. This time, the station is branded as Legends 77. It was since then divested by Crawford in mid-2007 and sold to his son, Don Crawford, Jr.

On March 1, 2010, KAAM added a talk block to its weekday lineup.  From 1pm to 4pm daily, a rotation of medical and financial programs dubbed "Ask the Pros" takes the place of regular music programming.

KAAM formerly broadcast using HD Radio, however discontinued in 2010.  Because the license to broadcast digital "HD Radio" is perpetual, the station could resume digital broadcasts at any time.

According to an editorial message broadcast by Don Crawford, Jr., current owner, the 2013 rating statistics indicate that KAAM was the most listened to AM radio station airing the Nostalgic format in the United States online via the internet. KAAM is streamed online via the popular TuneIn app 

Hermann Bockelmann's weekly program "Europe Today" was being re-aired weekly as "The Best of Bockelmann"

On Friday, May 19, 2017, owner Don Crawford, Jr. posted an announcement on the station's Facebook page  that KAAM would drop the nostalgia music in favor of Christian Talk on June 5, 2017.  The Legends music format continued to stream online for several years, apparently with many of the same hosts and with the support of the same advertisers.  However in 2017, the nostalgia music online provided by K.A.A.M. Online was completely discontinued.  Radio station KAAM continues to broadcast over-the-air and online as a Christian radio station only.

References

External links
770AM God, Country
KAAM official website
 DFW Radio Archives
 DFW Radio/TV History

AAM
Radio stations established in 1990
1990 establishments in Texas
AAM
Talk radio stations in the United States